The Technical Group of Independent Members was a heterogeneous political technical group with seats in the European Parliament between 1999 and 2001. Unlike other political groups of the European Parliament, it did not have a coherent political complexion. Its existence prompted a five-year examination of whether mixed Groups were compatible with the Parliament. After multiple appeals to the European Court of First Instance (now known as the General Court) and the European Court of Justice, the question was finally answered: overtly mixed Groups would not be allowed.

History

Creation of TGI
MEPs in the European Parliament form themselves into Groups along ideological, not national, lines. Each Group is assumed to have a common set of political principles, (known as a common "affinity", or "complexion"), and each Group thus formed is granted benefits. This puts MEPs who cannot form themselves into Groups at a disadvantage. In the Parliament's past, they got around this by forming Groups with only tenuous common ground, and Parliament turned a blind eye. But the crunch point arrived on 20 July 1999, when a Group called "TGI" ("TDI" in French, from "technique des deputés indépendants") was formed. The Group consisted of the spectacularly unlikely partnership of the far-right French Front National, the regionalist-separatist Lega Nord of Italy, and  liberal Italian Bonino List. Further, the 19 July letter ("constituent declaration") setting up the Group emphasised the political independence of the Group members from each other:

At the plenary sitting of 20 July 1999 the President of Parliament announced that the TGI Group had been set up.

Objections to its creation
Believing that the conditions laid down by the Rules of Procedure of the European Parliament for establishing Groups had not been met, the leaders of the other Groups called for the Committee on Constitutional Affairs to give an interpretation. The Committee on Constitutional Affairs ruled that the constituent declaration broke Rule 29(1), stating that:

First dissolution
Parliament was notified on 13 September 1999 of the ruling. TGI members made two proposals to amend the Rules of Procedure and allow mixed Groups to be formed, (one of which was signed by 68 other members), but the next day Parliament adopted (412 to 56 with 36 abstentions) the Committee on Constitutional Affairs's interpretation of Rule 29, forcibly dissolving the Group ("the act of 14 September 1999"), and making 13 September 1999 the last day of the Group's existence.

Appeals to the Court of First Instance
On 5 October 1999, Jean-Claude Martinez MEP and Charles de Gaulle MEP lodged two appeals with the Court of First Instance. The first one (Case T-222/99R) was based on Article 242 of the EC Treaty and was intended to suspend the enforcement of the act of 14 September 1999. The second one (Case T-222/99) was based on Article 230 of the EC Treaty and was intended to annul the act of 14 September 1999.

The first appeal (Case T-222/99R) was upheld, and the act of 14 September 1999 was suspended by the Court of First Instance on 25 November 1999.

Resurrection
The Group was temporarily resurrected on December 1, 1999 until the Court came to a decision on the second appeal. The Budget for the year was somewhat advanced, but the Committee on Budgets managed to come up with the money to give TGI the secretarial allowances and 14 temporary posts that a Group of its size was entitled to.

Court of First Instance rejects the appeals
Meanwhile the second appeal (Case T-222/99) had been joined by two others, one (Case T-327/99) from the Front National as a corporate entity, the other (T-329/99) from the Bonino List as a corporate entity and from Emma Bonino, Marco Pannella, Marco Cappato, Gianfranco Dell’Alba, Benedetto Della Vedova, Olivier Dupuis and Maurizio Turco as individuals.

On 2 October 2001, the Court of First Instance delivered its verdict (2002/C 17/20). It found that Article 230 of the EC Treaty did not contradict the act of 14 September 1999. It joined together the three appeals, dismissed them, and ordered the applicants to pay costs.

Second dissolution
President Fontaine announced that the Court of First Instance had declared against the appeal and that the disbandment was back in effect from October 2, 2001, the date of the declaration. TGI appeared on the list of Political Groups in the European Parliament for the last time on October 4, 2001.

Appeals to the European Court of Justice
On 11 October 2001, Gianfranco Dell'Alba on behalf of TGI announced that they would appeal the Court of First Instance's decision to the European Court of Justice. In the event, two appeals were lodged with the ECJ: one (Case C-486/01 P) from the Front National as a corporate entity on 17 December 2001, the other (Case C-488/01 P) from Jean-Claude Martinez as an individual on 11 December 2001.

European Court of Justice rejects the appeals
The Martinez appeal was thrown out (2004/C 59/03) and the applicant ordered to pay costs on November 11, 2003. The Front National appeal dragged out for another six months, but in the end it was also thrown out (2004/C 217/01) and the applicant ordered to pay costs on 29 June 2004.

Final result
After five years and several appeals to the Court of First Instance and the Court of Justice, the principle was settled: mixed Groups would not be allowed to exist.

Consequences
Whilst the Parliament and Courts concerned themselves with the existence of TGI, the Committee on Constitutional Affairs examined the implications of mixed Groups and the wider issue of political Groups per se.

Rationale for Groups
During their deliberations in December 1999, the Committee on Constitutional Affairs laid down the rationale for the existence of Groups:

Changes to the Rules of Procedure
In August 2003, the Committee recommended changes to the Rules of Procedure which would establish the benefits and funding to be provided to the Groups, and similarly those for the Non-Inscrits (the ungrouped members). These changes were later implemented.

Situation in February 2008
As of February 2008, the Parliament's Rules of Procedure formulate the requirement for Groups to have a common political affinity (Rule 29), define Groups as bodies that are part of the European Union (Rule 30), establish benefits available to the Groups (Rule 30) and Non-Inscrits (Rule 31), and who decides what positions each Group gets (Rule 32).

The requirement for a common affinity is on a "don't ask, don't tell" basis: the Groups are assumed to have one by virtue of their existence and provided they do not obviously act in a manner contrary to that assumption, the Parliament will not enquire too closely. If the Group members do deny their common affinity, then the Group may be challenged and dissolved. The exact wording of Rule 29, part 1 is:

These requirements had implications for the formulation of the far-right Group called "Identity, Tradition, Sovereignty" in 2007.

Member Parties at 23 July 1999
The Group was founded on July 20 with 29 members, but nine members (Angelilli, Berlato, Fini, Musumeci, Muscardini, Nobilia, Poli Bortone, Segni and Turchi) left on July 21 and two members (Atxalandabaso and Formentini) left on July 22, leaving a membership of 18 by July 23.

Sources
Department of Economics, University of California, Berkeley
Konrad-Adenauer-Stiftung
European Parliament
EUR-Lex
International Political Science Review
The Court of Justice of the European Communities
European Parliament archive of MEPs

References

Former European Parliament party groups
Technical parliamentary groups